The sumo competition at the 2022 World Games took place in July 2022, in Birmingham in United States, at the Boutwell Auditorium; the lightweight, middleweight, and heavyweight events were held on July 9 and the openweight events were held on July 10.

Originally scheduled to take place in July 2021, the Games were rescheduled for July 2022 as a result of the 2020 Summer Olympics postponement due to the COVID-19 pandemic.

The Egyptian sumo team was banned from competing in the remaining sumo events after "poor sportsmanship".

Medal table

Medalists

Men

Women

See also
 Sumo at the World Games

References

External links
 The World Games 2022
 International Sumo Federation
 Results book

 
2022 World Games
2022